Baroalba Creek is a river in the Northern Territory, Australia.

References

Rivers of the Northern Territory